Claudia Hernández González is a Salvadoran short story writer. She was born in El Salvador in 1975. She was awarded the Anna Seghers Prize in 2004. She is widely regarded as among the pre-eminent living Salvadoran writers. Many of her stories concern the grotesque elements of life during and after the civil war.

Bibliography 

 Otras ciudades (2001)
 Mediodía de frontera (2002)
 Olvida uno (2005)
 De fronteras (2007)

References 

1975 births
Living people
20th-century Salvadoran women writers
Salvadoran women short story writers
21st-century Salvadoran women writers
20th-century short story writers
21st-century short story writers